Leon Merian  (17 September 1923 – 15 August 2007) was an American jazz trumpeter and teacher.  Dizzy Gillespie described his playing as "One of the most beautiful sounds you'll ever hear."  Merian was also a French teacher and public school administrator.

Life
He was born Leon Megerdichian in South Braintree, Massachusetts, on 17 September 1923, to Armenian immigrant parents.

Merian learned trumpet from Georges Mager.

He was a sidesman to Lucky Millinder, touring with his band in the segregated south, where, not welcome at either "white" or "colored" establishments, he ended up sleeping on the tour bus.

Merian moved to 20th Century Fox Records in November 1958.

He later had his own band; one member of it was Herb Phillips.

His publications included the well known Trumpet Isometics.  He wrote an autobiography that was published in 2000.

Merian died on 15 August 2007, in Sarasota, Florida.

Discography

As leader
 The Magic Horn (Decca)

As sideman
 Specs Powell, Movin' In (Roulette, 1957)
 Tito Puente, The Essential Tito Puente (RCA, 2005)
 Pete Rugolo, Rugolomania (Columbia, 1955)

Lucky Millinder Orchestra
With the Lucky Millinder Orchestra:

Gladys Bruce
With Gladys Bruce:

Alan Freed Rock 'n' Roll Band

Bibliography
 Trumpet Isometrics
 Leon Merian, The Man Behind The Horn, Leon Merian with Bill Bridges, Diem Publishing Co, Bradenton, Florida, 2000, 287 pp.

References

External links
 Obituary

1923 births
2007 deaths
American jazz trumpeters